The 1995 Ole Miss Rebels football team represented the University of Mississippi during the 1995 NCAA Division I-A football season.

The Rebels were banned from appearing on television and the postseason due to severe sanctions handed down by the NCAA in November 1994. The 1995 Rebels are the last squad (through 2021) to be banned from television.

Schedule

Roster

References

Ole Miss
Ole Miss Rebels football seasons
Ole Miss Rebels football